HGT may refer to:
 Harrogate railway station, England
 Holland's Got Talent, a Dutch television show
 Horizontal gene transfer, non-hereditary genetic changes
 Hyper geometric test, in statistics